The 2019–20 Longwood Lancers men's basketball team represented Longwood University in the 2019–20 NCAA Division I men's basketball season. The Lancers, led by second-year head coach Griff Aldrich, played their home games at Willett Hall in Farmville, Virginia as members of the Big South Conference. They finished the season 14–18, 9–9 in Big South play to finish in fourth place. They lost in the quarterfinals of the Big South tournament to Hampton.

Previous season
The Lancers finished the 2018–19 season 16–18 overall, 5–11 in Big South play to finish in ninth place. In the Big South tournament, they were defeated by Hampton in the first round. The Lancers received an invitation to the CBI, where they defeated Southern Miss in the first round, before falling in the quarterfinals to DePaul.

Roster

Schedule and results

|-
!colspan=12 style=| Non-conference regular season

|-
!colspan=9 style=| Big South Conference regular season

|-
!colspan=12 style=| Big South tournament
|-

|-

Source

References

Longwood Lancers men's basketball seasons
Longwood Lancers
Longwood Lancers men's basketball
Longwood Lancers men's basketball